The Cabinet of Eswatini is the most senior level of the executive branch of the Government of Eswatini. It is composed of the Prime Minister, the Deputy Prime Minister and the Ministers. Ministers are appointed by the king on the advice of the prime minister. All cabinet members are required to be members of parliament.

Composition
Former Prime Minister Ambrose Mandvulo Dlamini announced his cabinet on 2 November 2018. They were all sworn in on 6 November.

<noinclude>

See also
King of Eswatini
List of prime ministers of Eswatini
Politics of Eswatini
 Royals of Eswatini

References

External links

Politics of Eswatini
Government of Eswatini